Frank Winsor Ashworth (October 16, 1926 – July 30, 2021) was a Canadian professional ice hockey centre. He played 18 games in the NHL with the Chicago Black Hawks.

Career statistics
                                            --- Regular Season ---  ---- Playoffs ----
Season   Team                        Lge    GP    G    A  Pts  PIM  GP   G   A Pts PIM
--------------------------------------------------------------------------------------
1943-44  New York Rovers             EHL     0    0    0    0    0  --  --  --  --  --
1943-44  Brooklyn Crescents          EHL     0    0    0    0    0  --  --  --  --  --
1946-47  Kansas City Pla-Mors        USHL   47   17   23   40   47  --  --  --  --  --
1946-47  Chicago Black Hawks         NHL    18    5    4    9    2  --  --  --  --  --
1947-48  Kansas City Pla-Mors        USHL   66   19   27   46   40   7   3   1   4   4
1948-49  Tulsa Oilers                USHL   58   36   60   96   27   7   3   5   8  14
1948-49  Hershey Bears               AHL     8    0    0    0    2  --  --  --  --  --
1949-50  Tulsa Oilers                USHL   70   28   50   78   44  --  --  --  --  --
1951-52  Calgary Stampeders          PCHL   55   22   26   48   60  --  --  --  --  --
1952-53  Calgary Stampeders          WHL    70   15   26   41   66   5   3   3   6   0
1953-54  Calgary Stampeders          WHL    67   24   42   66   28  18   5  11  16  21
1954-55  Calgary Stampeders          WHL     0    0    0    0    0  --  --  --  --  --
1954-55  Vancouver Canucks           WHL     0    5    7   12   20   5   0   1   1   2
1956-57  Calgary Stampeders          WHL    48   11   20   31   33   3   0   1   1   0
--------------------------------------------------------------------------------------
         NHL Totals                         18    5    4    9    2  --  --  --  --  --

References

External links

1926 births
2021 deaths
Calgary Stampeders (WHL) players
Canadian expatriate ice hockey players in the United States
Canadian ice hockey centres
Chicago Blackhawks players
Hershey Bears players
Ice hockey people from Saskatchewan
New York Rovers players
Sportspeople from Moose Jaw